Go Bus or Gobus may refer to:

 GoBus (Egypt), an intercity bus company in Egypt
 Go Bus Transport, a New Zealand bus company operating in Hamilton, Hawke's Bay, Tauranga, Christchurch, Gisborne, Dunedin and Invercargill
 Go Bus Christchurch, a bus company in New Zealand
 GoBus, the co-ordinated public transport network in Dunedin, New Zealand
 GO Transit bus services the intercity and commuter bus operations of GO Transit in Southern Ontario, Canada
 go bus, a branded version of bus rapid transit in New Jersey
 GoBus (Ohio), an intercity bus company in Ohio
 Go Buses, an intercity bus company in the United States owned by Academy Bus
 Go-Ahead Group, transport company in Newcastle which provides bus services around the UK under the brand Go Bus

See also
Globus Travel Group, a tourism coach operator